Kym Campbell (born August 4, 1981) is an American-Australian former singer-songwriter. Campbell had a career as an Australian-based singer-songwriter and issued two extended plays, So Alive (2008) and Preview (July 2010), and a studio album, Real Life (August 2012). She supported these releases with tours of Australia.

Kym Campbell joined the Gold Coast Music Industry Association in late 2004 and performed an acoustic set at their AGM in December. She recorded her eight-track debut extended play, So Alive (2008), at Griffith University. Kaysea of TheDwarf.com.au observed is, "bright and breezy, and makes me think of bonfires on the beach, parties on the sand where someone pulls out their guitar and charms you with some amazing, cruisy songs." Her second EP followed in July 2010,  Preview, and was also promoted by a national tour. It was produced by Michael Stangel (Veronicas, Shannon Noll).

Campbell supported the release of her debut album, Real Life (August 2012), with another Australian tour. The Gold Coast Panache Magazines reviewer observed, "[the] crafty collection brings together an eclectic mix of acoustic pop, surf-rock, folk and reggae." Dave Griffith of Buzz Magazine Australia, rated it as five-out-of-five stars and noticed, "Lovers of smooth music rejoice because Australia has a new darling... [she is] wowing the music world with [this album]... will be lapped up by those who love John Butler or The Waifs."

Kym Campbell was born in Denver, Colorado and grew up in Seattle, Washington. She attended Santa Clara University, where she completed a Bachelor of Science before immigrating to Australia to pursue post-graduate education at Griffith University. In 2010 Campbell became a dual US-Australian citizen where she now resides in the state of Queensland.

Campbell married in 2011 and gave birth to her first child in 2017 after a long struggle with PCOS related infertility.

References

1981 births
Living people
Santa Clara University alumni